Anatoly Ignashchenko (28 January 1930 – 5 April 2011) was a prominent Ukrainian architect, specializing in the design of monuments and memorial complexes. Mr. Ignashchenko was a member (academician) of the Ukrainian Academy of Arts. In 1974, he was awarded with the Shevchenko National Prize for his work on the Lesya Ukrainka monument. In 2010, he became awarded as a People's Artist of Ukraine. Other honours received include Order of Prince Yaroslav the Wise (2006) and Order of the Badge of Honour (1982).

Biography 
Anatoly Ignashchenko was born on January 28, 1930, in the village of Zaharivtsi (Khmelnitsky district, Khmelnytsky region). In 1953, he graduated from the Architecture Department of the Engineering Institute. He was a student of famous architect Joseph Karakis. From 1964 to 1966, he was the chief architect of the design institute "UkrNDIPUkrainian Urban Planning", in 1966-1969 he was an expert of the artistic expert board of the Ministry of Culture of the Ukrainian SSR. 

In 1969-1976, he worked as an architect of the Art Fund of the Union of Artists of the Ukrainian SSR. In 1976-1990, he worked as an architect-artist of the "Khudozhnyk" Association of the Art Fund of the Ukrainian SSR. Since 1990, he has been working as an artist. He died on April 5, 2011. He was buried in Kyiv at the Baikove Cemetery (plot number 42).

Projects 
Some of Mr. Ignashchenko's notable works include:

 Babi Yar memorial
 Lesya Ukrainka monument
 Monument to Orange Revolution
 Monuments to Vasyl Poryk and Taras Shevchenko in Paris
 Hill of Sorrow Monument, one of the first memorials erected for the Holodomor
 Monuments to Taras Shevchenko in Monroe, New York
 Monument of Lesya Ukrainka (Kyiv, 1973, Yalta, Saskatoon, Canada, 1976)
 Monument of I. Kozlovsky (p. Maryanivka Kyiv region)
 Monument of Ivan Petrovich Kotlyarevsky (Kyiv, 1974)

References

External links 
 Bio on National Academy of Arts Website

1930 births
2011 deaths
People from Khmelnytskyi Oblast
Ukrainian architects
Recipients of the Shevchenko National Prize
Recipients of the Order of Prince Yaroslav the Wise
Burials at Baikove Cemetery